was a Japanese actor.

Fujiwara worked regularly and extensively with Akira Kurosawa, and was known for both being adept at comic acting, as well as being able to take on serious roles.

Early life and career

Early life

Fujiwara was born on January 15, 1905, in Tokyo, Japan. Fujiwara's parents ran a printing business. The business did not go well, so at the age of 10, Fujiwara started working at a local confectionery store. By the age of 14 he had started selling timber for building and manufacturing in Shizuoka prefecture. A year later he returned to Tokyo to study as a pharmacist.

Asakusa Opera Movement

The  Movement was started in 1916, and was part of the mass culture of the time. By the 1920s it had become very popular. His early life focused initially focussed on music, before he was known as a comic actor  Perhaps inspired by this, Fujiwara enrolled at the Takinoga actor/martial arts school.

Following graduation, he approached actor Kenzo Kuroki at Asakisa's kinrukan to see if he would teach him acting. His first work was on stage as a chorist. Realising that he was short, not particularly attractive, and unlikely to have a main part on stage, he decided to diversify his skills for performance and started studying violin at Toyo music school.

Following the Great Kantō earthquake, the Asakusa Opera movement started losing popularity. As a result, Fujiwara worked at the movie theatre as a violinist, where his lesser height and unattractiveness were not an issue.

Marriage 
Perhaps, in spite of his looks, Fujiwara married an unknown village woman. They had a son; however, after his birth she died.

Casino Folies 

In July 1930, an old friend, actor and comedian Kenichi Enomoto, asked him to participate in forming the New  in the Asakusa district. The Casino Folies with its risqué showgirl entertainment, was often associated with the term  or "Erotic Grotesque Nonsense" era.  In 1933 he resigned from Casino Follies and became a movie actor.

First films 

His first movie was Ongaku Kigeki - Horoyui Jinsei  (English: "Musical Comedy - Intoxicated Life"), which was released in 1933. It was a comedy about the joys of beer drinking. This was the very first production of what was soon to become Toho Co., Ltd., the biggest and wealthiest studio during the so-called "Golden Age" of Japanese cinema of the 1950s and early 1960s. In fact, most of his movies, for 40 years, were made with Toho.

Marriage to Sadako Sawamura 
In 1936 he married popular fellow actor Sadako Sawamura, whom he had met whilst working together on set. Though they acted in many Toho Studio films, they were only in two together; Toyuki a Chinese/Japanese co production made in 1940 and Uma, made in 1941. They did not produce children and divorced in 1946. Fujiwara did not remarry.

In the late 1930, Kamatari found himself in trouble with the nationalist government. They were pushing for artists and high profile individuals to change their names to the traditional spelling, and he was under official censure to do so. Despite this, he kept his name.

Work with Kurosawa 

He made his first appearance in a Kurosawa film alongside Takashi Shimura in 1952's Ikiru. He played the role of Senkichi. Fujiwara's shomin persona is always that of a real-life person. Generally he played the role of an ordinary subject-citizen:  petty, conservative, mediocre, far from being handsome or rich. Over time he made this his specialty. All up, Fujiwara appeared in 12 of Kurosawa's films, and along with Mifune, Shimura, Nakadai and Chiaki, was regarded as one of Kurosawa's core actors.

Perhaps the two most famous roles for Kurosawa were the well-remembered role in The Lower Depths, where he plays a drunken Kabuki actor complaining about his "Bitol Organs", and his role as Manzo in Seven Samurai. Ironically, despite his roles generally being supporting roles to other action type actors like Mifune, Fujiwara was an accomplished martial artist which he had studied and applied to his stage performance in his earlier years.

He became a long-time member of director Akira Kurosawa's company of actors until his death. Though a capable and highly professional actor, his subtle technique was very often overshadowed by the charismatic performances of Shimura and Toshiro Mifune, with whom he developed a friendship . While on the set of Hidden Fortress he was drinking with Mifune, who became brusque. While smaller than Mifune, Fujiwara became annoyed at his rudeness, and despite the fact Mifune was a huge star in Japan at the time (and the film's lead), Fujiwara used a Karate blow to knock him to the ground. Rather than being angry, Mifune laughed but behaved well for the rest of the filming. He is remembered primarily for his supporting appearances in Kurosawa's films, particularly as the suspicious farmer Manzō (万造) in Seven Samurai, the deranged former mayor in Yojimbo, the spidery treasure-seeking farmer in The Hidden Fortress, and the drunken Kabuki actor in The Lower Depths. Apart from working with Kurosawa, he worked with the director Yasujirō Ozu in Tokyo Twilight, playing the role of Chin Chin Ken at the Ramen bar, and also voiced the role of daddy in the movie version of the long-running anime Sazae San.

He had difficulty remembering lines. When Arthur Penn, the American film director of Bonnie and Clyde, and Little Big Man, needed a Japanese actor for his film Mickey One, Penn was so impressed with the performance of Kamatari Fujiwara as the peasant who tries to disguise his daughter as a boy in Akira Kurosawa's 1954 Seven Samurai that he hired him to play the deaf-mute character simply known as "the artist" in his own film surrealist movie.

Manzo 
Fujiwara's perhaps most famous role abroad was as the character of Manzo in Seven Samurai, a paranoid peasant who protected his daughter from the attentions of the samurai by dressing her as a little boy. The character's story is part of the key plot. Manzo, like many of the characters that Fujiwara portrayed, is low-class and disheveled. Manzo is typical of the villagers, and his character often represents their interests. His smiling face is significant at the end of the film as it indicates that the villagers themselves are the real winners in the plot.

Kurosawa and Fujiwara disputed over how Manzo should be portrayed. Kurosawa wanted him played seriously while Fujiwara wanted to make his paranoia comical. Fujiwara won and when he saw the film again, Kurosawa found that Fujiwara made the right decision.

Hidden Fortress 
One of his largest roles was in the Kurosawa epic Hidden Fortress, playing a comic grotesque opposite Mifune. His annoying peasant character Matashichi gave inspiration to George Lucas for R2D2, although R2D2 is the complete opposite to Matashichi in personality. The taller fellow lead character, Tahei, played by Minoru Chiaki served as the inspiration for C-3PO. Additionally, the characters and general plotline involving a princess fleeing an evil empire formed the basis for Lucas's movie Star Wars.

Despite the influence, Fujiwara received no money from Lucas, and Lucas never personally thanked Fujiwara. Fujiwara may or may not have seen the Star Wars films, but he did not comment on what he thought of R2D2 or any other of the characters, though the subject of Star Wars was brought up in a televised discussion between himself, Akira Kurosawa, and his costars Misa Uehara and Minoru Chiaki. George Lucas acknowledged heavy influence of The Hidden Fortress on Star Wars, particularly the technique of telling the story from the perspective of the film's lowliest characters, C-3PO  and R2-D2.

Later life and death 
Fujiwara had a long running career, appearing in more than 70 films, and in addition to this more than 50 TV appearances, from the 1930s to 1984.

Fujiwara retired in the late 1970s, though he continued to make occasional television appearances. His final film role was a memorable cameo in Juzo Itami's The Funeral (お葬式, 1984). He died in 1985 at the age of 80 in a Tokyo hospital after suffering a heart attack. Osaka's Abuyama old Mound serves as his final burial site.

Filmography 

 Ongaku Kigeki - Horoyui Jinsei (1933)
 The Girl in the Rumor (1935)
 Tsuruhachi and Tsurujiro (1938)
 Chocolate and Soldiers (1938)
 Travelling Actors (1940)
 Hideko the Bus Conductor (1941)
 Blue Mountains (1949)
 The Munekata Sisters (1950)
 The Skin of the South (1952)
 Ikiru (1952, directed by Akira Kurosawa)
 Husband and Wife (1953, directed by Mikio Naruse)
 Tomei Ningen (1954)
 The Seven Samurai (1954, directed by Akira Kurosawa)
 An Inn at Osaka (1954)
 I Live in Fear (1955)
 The Lone Journey (1955)
 Romantic Daughters (1956)
 The Hidden Fortress (1958)
 Tokyo Twilight (1957, directed by Yasujirō Ozu)
 The Lower Depths (1957)
 Life of an Expert Swordsman (1959)
 The Sun's Burial (1960, directed by Nagisa Oshima)
 The Bad Sleep Well (1960)
 Approach of Autumn (1960)
 Yojimbo (1961, directed by Akira Kurosawa)
 Sanjuro (1962, directed by Akira Kurosawa)
 Heaven and Hell (1963)
 A Woman's Life (1963, directed by Mikio Naruse)
 Red Beard (1965)
 Mickey One (1965, directed by Arthur Penn)
 Taking The Castle (1965)
 The Sword of Doom (1966, directed by Kihachi Okamoto)
 The River of Tears (1967, directed by Kenji Misumi)
 Double Suicide (1969)
 Dodeskaden (1970)
 Battle of Okinawa (1971)
 Kagemusha (directed by Akira Kurosawa, 1980)
 Sailor Suit and Machine Gun (1981, directed by Shinji Somai)
 The Funeral (1984, directed by Juzo Itami)
 W's Tragedy (1984, directed by Shinichiro Sawai)

References

External links
 

1905 births
1985 deaths
20th-century Japanese male actors